The Dolly Rockit Rollers (DRR) are a flat track roller derby league based in Leicestershire, England.

Formed in January 2010, they are members of the Women's Flat Track Derby Association (WFTDA), which they joined in July 2014. The league has been a member of the United Kingdom Roller Derby Association (UKRDA) since September 2011.

League History
DRR were formed in January 2010 by skaters Sally-Anne Scrivener (derby name Slamabama) from Birmingham’s Central City Rollergirls and Nitro Noush of Rebellion Roller Girls. They were both living in Leicester and travelling to Birmingham and Milton Keynes respectively to play roller derby.

In conjunction with Central City Rollergrils, they organised a practice in the Beaumont Leys area of the city and were encouraged by the high turnout. Leicester has a long affinity with roller skating, with the Granby Halls roller rink widely popular until its closure in 1999, and this provided a solid basis for membership to increase over the following months. The fledgling league was named the Dolly Rockit Rollers, as a pun on the term “rock it” and an homage to Leicester’s National Space Centre.

The first bout for DRR was a mixed exhibition game in August 2010, with their first interleague bout (a 79-68 loss to the Newcastle Roller Girls) taking place a month later. This bout also marked the league’s debut at their new home, with the Dollies moving from Beaumont Leys to the larger Parklands Leisure Centre at this time. The team would play two more interleague bouts in 2010, winning both of them to finish the year on a 2-1 record.

Skater numbers continued to increase and by May 2011 DRR had enough advanced skaters to form a ‘B’ team, the Raggy Dollz. The DRR ‘B’ team made an unofficial debut in May 2011, skating under the name “Free Birds”, before playing their first official bout against the Birmingham Blitz Dames’ ‘B‘ team in September of that year. The Dollies were admitted into UKRDA shortly after this bout.

DRR’s All-Stars played a total of twelve public bouts in 2011, with nine wins in total. This record saw them voted amongst the top eight members of the UKRDA and qualified them to play at the Tattoo Freeze 2012 tournament in January of the following year. They would eventually be eliminated in the quarterfinals after a tense game against the Auld Reekie Rollergirls.

In October 2012, the Dollies were accepted as a member of the WFTDA Apprentice Program, and became a full member of the WFTDA in July 2014.

Teams
The league currently fields two teams:

 All-Stars (A)
 Rockin' Rockets (B)

The league has undergone restructuring with some teams retired:
Raggy Dollz - B team, disbanded 2013
Foxton Blocks - home team, disbanded 2014. Their name was a reference to Foxton Locks, a popular Leicestershire tourist attraction.
Angry Belvoirs - home team, disbanded 2014. Their name was a pun on the Leicestershire town of Belvoir (pronounced “beaver”).
Undercover Meerkats - home team, disbanded 2014. Their name was a pun on the Leicester's famous market.

National Team Representation 
At the 2011 Roller Derby World Cup and 2014 Roller Derby World Cup, the league's Rogue Runner played for Team England Roller Derby. Holly Sheet was selected for Team Ireland Roller Derby in 2011.

WFTDA rankings

*Please note that rankings were suspended in March 2020 in light of the COVID-19 pandemic.

Five Nations Roller Derby Championships 
At the first British Championships in 2015, the Dolly Rockit Rollers were placed into the 'Women T3 West' tier. They lost all their games.

For the British Roller Derby Championships 2016: Women Tier 4 West, the Dollys performed better, ending in second place.

This strong performance led to their promotion back to the Women's T3 Regional division for 2017, where they remained in 2018.

In 2021, the British Championships rebranded as the Five Nations Roller Derby Championships.

Game History 
The following is a list of open-door interleague games played by the Dolly Rockit Rollers since their inception in 2010.

Last updated: 25 Jul 2012Source: Euroderby.org

Sources

External links
 Official website

Roller derby leagues established in 2010
Roller derby in England
Roller derby leagues in the United Kingdom
Women's sports teams in England
2010 establishments in England